Guzmania lemeana is a species of plant in the genus Guzmania. It is an epiphyte in the family Bromeliaceae. There are no recorded synonyms.

References

lemeana